Toby Tortoise Returns is a 1936 animated Technicolor cartoon in Walt Disney's Silly Symphonies series. It was directed by Wilfred Jackson. It is a sequel to the 1935 short The Tortoise and the Hare, and premiered on August 22, 1936.

This time the plot revolves around a boxing match. The short features characters from other Silly Symphonies, including Elmer Elephant and Tillie Tiger from Elmer Elephant, Fifer Pig, Fiddler Pig, Practical Pig and the Big Bad Wolf from Three Little Pigs, and Jenny Wren and the cuckoo from Who Killed Cock Robin?. It was released in VHS, Laserdisc, and DVD formats in various countries.

Plot
Max Hare is boxing Toby Tortoise and beating him severely in round one. Between each round, Jenny Wren from “Who Killed Cock Robin?” tells Toby that she likes a man who takes his time, which seems to reinvigorate him. In round two, Max declares what the final blow should be, but Toby pulls into his shell to avoid Max's fists. Feeling robbed, Max demands that Toby should come out and face him, but Toby says that he feels safer inside his shell. Max tries to make Toby come out by dumping a bucket of water into his shell, but then Toby pops out wearing a diving helmet and squirts water in Max's face. At the end of his patience, Max fills Toby's shell with fireworks to draw him out. However, this backfires Toby as he unintentionally begins shooting fireworks in Max's direction. One firework sends Max flying out of the arena with the paramedics who are waiting to take Toby to the hospital. When the fireworks stop, Toby is declared the winner.

Voice cast
 Max Hare: Ned Norton
 Toby Tortoise: Eddie Holden
 Jenny Wren: Martha Wentworth
 Bunnies: Leone Ledoux, Marcellite Garner

Home media
The short was released on December 4, 2001, on Walt Disney Treasures: Silly Symphonies - The Historic Musical Animated Classics.

References

External links
 
 

1936 films
1936 short films
1930s sports films
Animated films about rabbits and hares
Animated films about turtles
Boxing animation
American boxing films
Films directed by Wilfred Jackson
Films produced by Walt Disney
American sequel films
Silly Symphonies
1930s Disney animated short films
1936 animated films
Films based on the Tortoise and the Hare
Films scored by Frank Churchill
Films scored by Leigh Harline
1930s American films